Helman Palije (born 24 June 1967) is a Malawian boxer. He competed in the men's middleweight event at the 1988 Summer Olympics.

References

External links
 

1967 births
Living people
Malawian male boxers
Olympic boxers of Malawi
Boxers at the 1988 Summer Olympics
Commonwealth Games competitors for Malawi
Boxers at the 1986 Commonwealth Games
Place of birth missing (living people)
Middleweight boxers